The Elector of Mainz was one of the seven Prince-electors of the Holy Roman Empire. As both the Archbishop of Mainz and the ruling prince of the Electorate of Mainz, the Elector of Mainz held a powerful position during the Middle Ages. The Archbishop-Elector was president of the electoral college, archchancellor of the empire, and the Primate of Germany as the papal legate north of the Alps, until the dissolution of the empire in 1806.

The origin of the title dates back to 747, when the city of Mainz was made the seat of an archbishop, and a succession of able and ambitious prelates made the district under their rule a strong and vigorous state. Among these men were important figures in the history of Germany such as Hatto I, Adalbert of Mainz, Siegfried III, Peter of Aspelt and Albert of Brandenburg. There were several violent contests between rivals for the archbishopric, and their power struggles occasionally moved the citizens of Mainz to revolt. The lands of the elector lay around the city of Mainz on both banks of the Rhine; their area reached 3200 sq. miles by the end of the Empire. The last elector was Karl Theodor von Dalberg, who lost his temporal power when the archbishopric was secularized in 1803.

Elector of Mainz (1356–1803)

The Archbishop of Mainz was an influential ecclesiastic and secular prince in the Holy Roman Empire between 780–782 and 1802.  In Church hierarchy, the Archbishop of Mainz was the primas Germaniae, the substitute for the Pope north of the Alps.  Aside from Rome, the See of Mainz is the only other see referred to as a "Holy See", although this usage became rather less common.

This archbishopric was a substantial ecclesiastical principality of the Holy Roman Empire.  The ecclesiastical principality included lands near Mainz on both the left and right banks of the Rhine, as well as territory along the Main above Frankfurt (including the district of Aschaffenburg), the Eichsfeld region in Lower Saxony and Thuringia, and the territory around Erfurt in Thuringia.  The archbishop was also, traditionally, one of the Imperial Prince-Electors, the Arch-chancellor of Germany, and presiding officer of the electoral college technically from 1251 and permanently from 1263 until 1803. 

The see was established in ancient Roman times, in the city of Mainz, which had been a Roman provincial capital called Moguntiacum, but the office really came to prominence upon its elevation to an archdiocese in 780/82.  The first bishops before the 4th century have legendary names, beginning with Crescens. The first verifiable Bishop of Mainz was Martinus in 343. The ecclesiastical and secular importance of Mainz dates from the accession of St. Boniface to the see in 747. Boniface was previously an archbishop, but the honor did not immediately devolve upon the see itself until his successor Lullus.

In 1802, Mainz lost its archiepiscopal character. In the secularizations that accompanied the Reichsdeputationshauptschluss ("German mediatization") of 1803, the seat of the elector, Karl Theodor von Dalberg, was moved to Regensburg, and the electorate lost its left bank territories to France, its right bank areas along the Main below Frankfurt to Hesse-Darmstadt and the Nassau princes, and Eichsfeld and Erfurt to Prussia. Dalberg retained the Aschaffenburg area however, and when the Holy Roman Empire finally came to an end in 1806, this became the core of Dalberg's new Grand Duchy of Frankfurt. Dalberg resigned in 1813 and in 1815 the Congress of Vienna divided his territories between the King of Bavaria, the Elector of Hesse, the Grand Duke of Hesse-Darmstadt and the Free City of Frankfurt.

The modern Diocese of Mainz was founded in 1802, within the territory of France and in 1814 its jurisdiction was extended over the territory of Hesse-Darmstadt. Since then it has had two cardinals and via various concordats was allowed to retain the mediæval tradition of the cathedral chapter electing a successor to the bishop.

Bishops and archbishops

Bishops of Moguntiacum, 80–745

Crescens c. 80–103
Marinus c. 103–109
St. Crescentius c. 109–127
Cyriacus c. 127–141
Hilarius c. 141–161
Martin I c. 161–175
Celsus c. 175–197
Lucius c. 197–207
Gotthard c. 207–222
Sophron c. 222–230
Heriger I c. 230–234
Ruther c. 234–254
Avitus c. 254–276
Ignatius c. 276–289
Dionysius c. 289–309
Ruprecht I c. 309–321
Adalhard c. 320s
Lucius Annaeus c. 330s
Martin II c. 330s – c. 360s
Sidonius I c. late 360s  – c. 386
Sigismund c. 386 – c. 392
Theonistus or Thaumastus
Maximus
Lupold c. 392 – c. 409
Nicetas c. 409 – c. 417
Marianus c. 417 – c. 427
Aureus c. 427 – c. 443
Eutropius c. 443 – c. 467
Adalbald
Nather
Adalbert (I)
Lantfried
Sidonius II  ? – c. 589
Siegbert I c. 589–610
Ludegast c. 610–615
Rudwald c. 615
Lubald ?  fl. c. 625
Rigibert 708-724
Gerold 724–743
Gewilip c. 744 – c. 745

Archbishops of Mainz, 745–1251

Saint Boniface 745–754
Lullus 754–786 (First archbishop)
Richholf 787–813
Adolf 813–826
Odgar 826–847
Rabanus Maurus 848–856
Karl 856–863
Ludbert 863–889
Sunderhold 889–891
Hatto I 891–913
Herigar 913–927
Hildebert 927-937
Frederick 937–954
William 954–968
Hatto II 968–970
Rudbrecht 970–975
Willigis 975–1011
Erkanbald 1011–1021
Aribo 1021–1031
Bardo 1031–1051
Luitpold 1051–1059
Siegfried I 1060–1084
Wezilo 1084–1088
Rudhart 1088–1109
Adalbert I von Saarbrücken 1111–1137
Adalbert II von Saarbrücken 1138–1141
Markholf 1141–1142
Henry I 1142–1153
Arnold von Selenhofen 1153–1160
Christian I 1160–1161
Rudolf of Zähringen 1160–1161 (opposing)
Conrad I of Wittelsbach 1161–1165
Christian I 1165–1183
Conrad I of Wittelsbach (restored) 1183–1200
Luitpold von Scheinfeld 1200–1208
Sigfried II von Eppstein 1200–1230 (in opposition until 1208)
Sigfried III von Eppstein 1230–1249
Christian III von Weisenau 1249–1251

Archbishops-Electors of Mainz, 1251–1803

Gerhard I von Daun-Kirberg 1251–1259
Werner II von Eppstein 1260–1284
Heinrich II von Isny 1286–1288
Gerhard II von Eppstein 1286–1305
Peter of Aspelt 1306–1320
Matthias von Bucheck 1321–1328
Heinrich III von Virneberg 1328–1337
Baldwin of Luxembourg 1328–1336, administrator
Gerlach von Nassau 1346–1371
Johann I von Luxemburg-Ligny 1371–1373
Louis of Meissen 1374–1379
Adolf I von Nassau 1379–1390
Konrad II von Weinsberg 1390–1396
Joffrid von Leiningen 1396–1397
Johann II von Nassau 1397–1419
Conrad III of Dhaun, Wild- and Rhinegrave zum Stein 1419–1434
Dietrich Schenk von Erbach 1434–1459
Dieter von Isenburg 1460–1461
Adolf II von Nassau (or Adolf III) 1461–1475
Dieter von Isenburg (restored) 1476–1482
Adalbert III of Saxony 1482–1484
Bertold von Henneberg-Römhild 1484–1504
Jakob von Liebenstein 1504-1508
Uriel von Gemmingen 1508–1514
Albert III of Brandenburg 1514–1545
Sebastian von Heusenstamm 1545–1555
Daniel Brendel von Homburg 1555–1582
Wolfgang von Dalberg 1582–1601
Johann Adam von Bicken 1601–1604
Johann Schweikhard von Kronberg 1604–1626
Georg Friedrich von Greiffenklau 1626–1629
Anselm Casimir Wambold von Umstadt 1629–1647
Johann Philipp von Schönborn 1647–1673
Lothar Friedrich von Metternich-Burscheid 1673–1675
Damian Hartard von der Leyen-Hohengeroldseck 1675–1678
Karl Heinrich von Metternich-Winneburg 1679
Anselm Franz von Ingelheim 1679–1695
Lothar Franz von Schönborn 1695–1729
Franz Ludwig von Pfalz-Neuburg 1729–1732
Philipp Karl von Eltz-Kempenich 1732–1743
Johann Friedrich Karl von Ostein 1743–1763
Emmerich Joseph von Breidbach zu Bürresheim 1763–1774
Friedrich Karl Joseph von Erthal 1774–1802
Karl Theodor von Dalberg 1802–1803

Notes